KHT or kht may refer to:

 Kernel-based Hough transform in digital image processing
 Khamti language, ISO 639-3 code
 Khost Airfield, Afghanistan, IATA code 
 Közhasznú társaság, former type of community interest company in Hungary